Choi Ha-won (최하원, born 19 August 1937) is a South Korean film director and screenwriter. He directed 25 films between 1968 and 1990.

Selected filmography
 The Old Jar Craftsman (1969)
 Invited People (1981)

References

External links
 
 

1937 births
Living people
South Korean film directors
South Korean screenwriters